The William H. Brown House is a private house located at 800 Ely Street in Allegan, Michigan. It was added to the National Register of Historic Places in 1987.

History
William H. Brown was a Methodist preacher and an early member of Allegan's First Methodist Episcopal Church. He first arrived in the Allegan area in 1836, and built this house in 1854.

Description
The William H. Brown House is a two-story frame Italianate structure with clapboard siding with a low-pitched hipped roof. The eaves widely overhang the walls, and the corners of the house have pilasters. A porch has been added to the side of the house.

References

National Register of Historic Places in Allegan County, Michigan
Italianate architecture in Michigan
Houses completed in 1854